American Buffalo is a 1996 drama film directed by Michael Corrente and starring Dustin Hoffman, Dennis Franz, and Sean Nelson, the only members of the cast. The film is based on David Mamet's 1975 play American Buffalo.

The film was produced by Gregory Mosher, who also directed the theatrical version of American Buffalo.

Plot
Donny runs a junk shop in a sparsely populated and decaying neighborhood. Teach, who has no visible means of support, spends many hours a day at the shop, as does Bobby, a young man who is eager to please Donny in any way he can.

Teach comes up with a scheme to rob the home of a man whose safe is said to contain rare coins. Bobby is often sent on errands for food or information. Teach's nerves are already on edge when Bobby suddenly returns to say that a third man involved in that night's robbery can't go through with it because he is in the hospital. Donny distrusts what he is hearing and is unable to locate the man in the hospital, whereupon Teach angrily turns on Bobby.

Cast
 Dustin Hoffman as Teach
 Dennis Franz as Donny
 Sean Nelson as Bobby

Production
In 1986, The Cannon Group, Inc. announced that a film adaptation in the works, but the film was eventually stuck in development hell for years.

Al Pacino, who originated the role of Teach on Broadway, was the first choice to play the role in the adaptation; however, Pacino did not respond in a timely fashion so Corrente offered the role to Dustin Hoffman. The film was shot on location in Pawtucket, Rhode Island, Corrente's home town.

Reception
Stephen Holden called it an "ugly fable of American free enterprise at the bottom of the food chain," adding, "With its staccato, profanity-laced language and metaphorically potent setting, American Buffalo folds a stylized parody of American gangster movies into a bleak Samuel Beckett vision that is wide enough to accommodate many interpretations....In filming American Buffalo, Mr. Corrente has taken as conventionally naturalistic an approach as the play permits, playing down its social metaphors to concentrate on the characters' psychology." Lisa Schwarzbaum gave the film a "B", saying "American Buffalo is about nothing less Mametian than commerce, friendship, betrayal, despair, and American hustle. Director Michael Corrente (Federal Hill) works at getting the story off the stage (it's set in a junk shop) by occasionally moving to an empty, decrepit city street. But mostly he just locks on to Hoffman and Franz."

Roger Ebert gave the film 2 and a half out of four stars, saying "It is a cliché, but true, that some plays have their real life on the stage. American Buffalo is a play like that—or, at least, it is not a play that finds its life in this movie....Because the film never really brings to life its inner secrets, it seems leisurely, and toward the end, it seems long. It doesn't have the energy or the danger of James Foley's film version of Mamet's Glengarry Glen Ross. The language is all there, and it is a joy, but the irony is missing. Or, more precisely, the irony about the irony."

Two months later, upon the film's UK release, Anne Billson of The Daily Telegraph concluded "The film's principal interest lies, as it always does with Mamet, in the hypnotic language; repeat your sentences about 20 times, shuffling the word order, repeat the first name of whomever you're talking to as though it were a mantra, add a judicious sprinkling of obscenities, and you've got the general idea. Franz, of television's NYPD Blue, is terrific, but Hoffman, performing in 'street' mode, complete with long greasy hair, never allows you to forget that he's reciting lines. Eventually the hypnotic repetitiveness of the language and the total lack of action did their work, and the dreaded Sandman, who hovers constantly at the shoulder of all film reviewers, paid me one of his visits."

Soundtrack
The score was composed and orchestrated by Thomas Newman.  In addition to Newman on piano, musicians included Steve Kujala (reeds); George Doering, Bill Bernstein, Rick Cox, (guitars); Harvey Mason (drums); and Mike Fisher (percussion).

It was released by Varèse Sarabande, paired with Newman's work for the unrelated 1994 film Threesome (tracks 12–20).

Tracks

 Buffalo Head (2:43)
 Classical Money (1:33)
 Bobby (:54)
 What Kind Of This (2:10)
 Jaw (1:11)
 Bobby Bobby Bobby Bobby (1:22)
 King High Flush (1:01)
 Nothing Out There - Thomas Newman and Rick Cox (1:25)
 Chump Change (1:17)
 The Guy (1:20)
 Tails You Lose (2:43)
 Different Species (:33)
 Stranded - Bill Bernstein (1:08)
 Threesome (2:24)
 Post-Modern Eve (:46)
 Doomed Relationships (1:29)
 Sacred Vows (1:36)
 Concupiscence (:49)
 Leprechaun (2:03)
 Drive Away (1:09)

References

External links
 
 
 
American Buffalo at Turner Classic Movies

1996 drama films
1996 LGBT-related films
1996 films
American drama films
American LGBT-related films
British drama films
1990s English-language films
American films based on plays
American independent films
Films with screenplays by David Mamet
Films scored by Thomas Newman
Film4 Productions films
British independent films
Films based on works by David Mamet
1996 independent films
Films directed by Michael Corrente
1990s American films
1990s British films